Braxton L. Garrett (born August 5, 1997) is an American professional baseball pitcher for the Miami Marlins of Major League Baseball (MLB). He was drafted seventh overall by the Marlins in the 2016 MLB draft.

Amateur career
Garrett attended Foley High School in Foley, Alabama his freshman and sophomore years. Prior to his junior year he transferred to Florence High School in Florence, Alabama. As a sophomore at Foley in 2014, he was 8–2 with a 1.23 earned run average (ERA) with 108 strikeouts in 57 innings. In July of that year he committed to Vanderbilt University to play college baseball. As a junior at Florence in 2015, Garrett was 7–1 with a 0.75 ERA with 141 strikeouts in  innings. In August after that season, he played in the Perfect Game All-American Classic at Petco Park. Later that year, he played for the 18U National Team that won the World Cup.

Professional career
Garrett was considered one of the top prospects for the 2016 Major League Baseball draft. He was selected seventh overall in the draft by the Miami Marlins.  He agreed to sign with the Marlins for a $4,145,900 signing bonus. He made his professional debut in 2017 with the Greensboro Grasshoppers of the Class A South Atlantic League, where he posted a 1-0 record with a 2.93 ERA in four starts before he underwent Tommy John surgery in June, ending his season.

MLB.com ranked Garrett as Miami's fifth best prospect going into the 2018 season. However, he also missed all of that season, as he was recovering from the surgery he had undergone the previous year. Garrett returned in 2019, beginning the year with the Jupiter Hammerheads of the Class A-Advanced Florida State League, and also pitched in one game for the Jacksonville Jumbo Shrimp of the Class AA Southern League. Over 21 starts between the two clubs, he went 6-7 with a 3.54 ERA.

On September 13, 2020, the Marlins selected Garrett’s contract and he made his major league debut that day in the second game of a doubleheader.

References

External links

1997 births
Living people
People from Foley, Alabama
Baseball players from Alabama
Major League Baseball pitchers
Miami Marlins players
Greensboro Grasshoppers players
Jupiter Hammerheads players
Jacksonville Jumbo Shrimp players